Grayson Trent Davey (born May 28, 2001) is an American sport shooter.

He participated at the 2018 ISSF World Shooting Championships.

References

External links

Living people
2001 births
American male sport shooters
Trap and double trap shooters
Sportspeople from Anchorage, Alaska
21st-century American people